is a scrolling shooter developed and published by MOSS, first released on April 25, 2013 for the Xbox 360 in Japan. It was later released digitally in North America and Europe on September 4, 2015. After its console debut, Caladrius was ported to arcades under the name Caladrius AC, adding extra game modes and supporting Sega's ALL.Net system. The game was released for the PlayStation 3 under the name Caladrius Blaze on August 14, 2014 exclusively in Japan. This version added extra characters, stages, and game modes. The updated version was also released for the PlayStation 4 on August 9, 2016 and Microsoft Windows on January 12, 2017, all of which were published by H2 Interactive. On July 19, 2019 the game was released on the Nintendo Switch.

Gameplay

Story

Characters
Alex Martin
Kei Percival
Maria Therese Bloomfield
Sophia Fulcanelli
Nightmare of the Lilith
Caladrius
Cecilia N. Albright
Noah Twinning
Nina Twinning
Layis Naje

Antagonists
Iris A. Baladin
Eleanor Riegl
Milia Marivene
Islay J. Pulsion
Graham G. Baladin
Beelzebub

Reception
Famitsu magazine scored Caladrius a 31 out of 40 and Caladrius Blaze  a 29 out of 40.

References

External links

2013 video games
ALL.Net games
Arcade video games
MOSS (company) games
PlayStation 3 games
PlayStation 4 games
Scrolling shooters
Video games developed in Japan
Video games featuring female protagonists
Video games scored by Manabu Namiki
Windows games
Xbox 360 games
Nintendo Switch games